In enzymology, a phosphonopyruvate hydrolase is an enzyme that catalyzes the chemical reaction

3-phosphonopyruvate + H2O  pyruvate + phosphate

Thus, the two substrates of this enzyme are 3-phosphonopyruvate and H2O, whereas its two products are pyruvate and phosphate.

This enzyme belongs to the family of hydrolases, specifically those acting on carbon-phosphorus bonds.  The systematic name of this enzyme class is '''. This enzyme is also called PPH'''.

References

 
 
 

EC 3.11.1
Enzymes of unknown structure